Jamal al-Din Khan was the Khan of the Talysh Khanate until 1786.

Early life

Sayyid Abbas, the father of Jamal al-Din Khan, was a descendant of the Islamic prophet Muhammad and arrived from Azerbaijan to the Talysh Territory. He married Ahu Khanum, the sister of the Bek, from the village of Boradiga Asad-Bek. From this marriage, Sayyid Jamaladdin was born.

In 1736, Seyid Abbas-Bek sent Seyid Jamaladdin to the service of Nadir Shah in Sugovushan. Interestingly, Jamaladdin Bey received the nickname Gara (“black”) in this service because of the color of his skin. Seyid Jamaladdin received the title of Khan from Nadir Shah for courage during his visit to Dagestan and became known as Jamal al-Din Khan.

On the throne

After the assassination of Nadir Shah in 1747, many khanates and sultans formed on the territory of Azerbaijan, one of which was the Talysh Khanate. After the death of Seyd Abbas, the khanate was headed by his  son Jamal al-Din Khan. Jamal al-Din Khan strengthened the borders and created a standing army. To strengthen the central government, he added the lands of unsatisfied feudal lords to the lands of the khans.

To protect the khanate from attacks, he moved the capital to Lankaran. During this period, Lankaran became an important port city on the shores of the Caspian Sea. Khan built the city walls, a khan's palace, a mosque, a bathhouse, a market and a caravanserai. There were two markets in the city: upper (central) and lower.

During the reign of Jamal al-Din Khan, relations between Kerim Khan Zend deteriorated. Ally Kerim Khan Khan Gilana Hidayat Khan attacked the Talysh Khanate in 1768 and defeated the troops of Jamal al-Din Khan. Jamal al-Din Khan was forced to pay taxes to Hidayat Khan. Jamal al-Din Khan sent his brother Karbalai Sultan to the shed of Khan of Quba Fatali Khan to get help against Gilan. In 1785, the Talysh Khanate joined the lands of Fath Ali Khan. 1786 Jamal al-Din Khan died. After his death, the son of Mir-Mostafa Khan Khan entered the throne.

References

Sources 
 
 
 
 

1786 deaths
Talysh Khanate
Talysh people